Sibi is a city in Balochistan, Pakistan.

Sibi may also refer to:

 Sibi (king), a character in Hindu and Buddhist mythology
 Sibi (name), including a list of people with the name
 Sibi District, in Balochistan, Pakistan
 Sibi Tehsil, a subdivision of Sibi District
 Sibi, capital city of the district and tehsil 
 Sibi Division, a former administrative division of Balochistan, Pakistan
 Sibi, Iran, a village in Sabzevar County, Razavi Khorasan Province
Sibi, a character in the 2010 documentary Sibi, l’âme du violon

See also 
 Siby (disambiguation)